Nouelia insignis is a species of flowering plant in the family Asteraceae, and the only species in the genus Nouelia. It is found only in Yunnan and Sichuan provinces, China, where it is threatened by habitat loss.

References

Wunderlichioideae
Monotypic Asteraceae genera
Flora of China
Near threatened plants
Taxonomy articles created by Polbot